Chandal may refer to:

Chandal (tribe)
Chandal, Bangladesh
Chandala